General elections were held in Liechtenstein on 13 March 2005. The result was a victory for the Progressive Citizens' Party, whose leader, Otmar Hasler, became Head of Government.

Results

By electoral district

References

Elections in Liechtenstein
Liechtenstein
Parliamentary election
March 2005 events in Europe